Yeoh Ken Nee (born 30 April 1983) is a Malaysian diver. As a 15-year-old he competed in Diving at the 1998 Commonwealth Games. He competed at the 2000 Summer Olympics in Sydney. In 2009 he competed in the 2009 World Aquatics Championships in the Men's 3 m synchro springboard and Men's 3 m springboard, finishing in 11th and 29th position respectively. In June 2010 he competed in the 2010 FINA Diving World Cup in Changzhou, Jiangsu, People's Republic of China. Recently, his diving team even won a silver medal in the 2010 Asian Games at Guangzhou, China. In 2012 he competed in the 2012 Summer Olympics in London. He has become the first Malaysian to qualify for a final of an individual event in the diving competition at the Olympics. He was ranked 10th in Men's 3m Springboard diving event.

Swimwear

Arena
 ARN-8044 BLU
 ARN-9034 BPNK
 ARN-9058 BLK

Honour

Honour of Malaysia
  : Medallist of the Order of the Defender of the Realm (P.P.N.) (2003)

References

1983 births
Living people
Malaysian people of Chinese descent
Malaysian male divers
Olympic divers of Malaysia
Divers at the 2000 Summer Olympics
Divers at the 2012 Summer Olympics
Asian Games medalists in diving
Divers at the 2010 Asian Games
Divers at the 2006 Asian Games
Divers at the 2002 Asian Games
Asian Games silver medalists for Malaysia
Asian Games bronze medalists for Malaysia
Commonwealth Games medallists in diving
Commonwealth Games silver medallists for Malaysia
Commonwealth Games bronze medallists for Malaysia
Medalists at the 2002 Asian Games
Medalists at the 2006 Asian Games
Medalists at the 2010 Asian Games
Southeast Asian Games bronze medalists for Malaysia
Southeast Asian Games medalists in diving
Medallists of the Order of the Defender of the Realm
Divers at the 1998 Commonwealth Games
Competitors at the 2005 Southeast Asian Games
21st-century Malaysian people
Medallists at the 1998 Commonwealth Games